Highlands Hammock State Park is a  park  west of Sebring in Highlands County, Florida, off U.S. 27. The park opened in 1931, four years before the Florida state park system was created.  It was listed on the National Register of Historic Places in 2018.

Ecology

Flora
Elevated boardwalks meander through an old-growth bald cypress swamp with cabbage palmettos, ferns, bromeliads, orchids and other epiphytes.

Fauna
White-tailed deer, American alligators, gopher tortoises, frogs, otters, golden silk spiders, pileated woodpeckers, red-shouldered hawks, barred owls and Florida scrub jays are common in the park. Florida black bears, bald eagles, white ibis, gray squirrels, bobcats and the rare Florida panther are seen on occasion.

History
Local citizens, concerned about plans to turn the hammock into farmland, acquired the property in 1931 and promoted it as a candidate for national park status, an early example of grass-roots public support for environmental preservation. One of the prime movers behind the effort was Mrs. Margaret Roebling, daughter-in-law of Washington Augustus Roebling.

Though it never reached national park status, it became one of the four original Florida State Parks when the state park system was created in 1935. The Civilian Conservation Corps (CCC), established during the Great Depression, built a camp at Highlands Hammock as a headquarters, and developed additional park facilities and the beginnings of a botanical garden.

Florida Civilian Conservation Corps Museum 
The park features the Florida Civilian Conservation Corps Museum with interactive exhibits about the 1930-1940s period of the park's construction, and the history of the CCC in Florida and the United States.  The museum is located in a building constructed by the CCC.

Recreational activities
The park includes a scenic three-mile (5 km) loop drive that gives access to the park's nine trails, and can be used for inline skating. An eleven-mile (18 km) trail can be traversed by bicyclists, horseback riders or wildlife viewers. Birding may also be done, since the park is part of the Great Florida Birding Trail. Ranger-guided tours are scheduled frequently.

There is a campground with full hookups, and areas for full, primitive, and youth camping. A picnicking area is available with an adjacent playground and fun
, as well as a restaurant, called "The Hammock Inn". During the fall and winter season the Friends of Highlands Hammock sponsor a Music in the Park Concert series the third Saturday of the month.

Hours
Florida state parks are open between 8 a.m. and sundown every day of the year (including holidays).

Gallery

References

External links
 Highlands Hammock State Park at Florida State Parks
 Map of Highlands Hammock State Park at Florida's Department of Environmental Protection
 Highlands Hammock State Park photos at Greater Lake Placid Florida Chamber of Commerce
 Highlands Hammock State Park history
 "Museum Dedication Reveres Conservationists of Past", November 1, 2003

State parks of Florida
Parks in Highlands County, Florida
Swamps of Florida
Museums in Highlands County, Florida
History museums in Florida
Civilian Conservation Corps museums
Civilian Conservation Corps in Florida
Protected areas established in 1931
Wetlands of Florida
Sebring, Florida
Landforms of Highlands County, Florida
1931 establishments in Florida
National Register of Historic Places in Highlands County, Florida
Parks on the National Register of Historic Places in Florida
National Park Service rustic in Florida